John Michael Harold Copley CBE (born 12 June 1933), is a British theatre and opera producer and director.

He was born in Birmingham to Ernest and Lilian (née Forbes) Copley, and attended King Edward VI Five Ways grammar school. After a brief career as an actor, he became stage manager at Sadler's Wells in 1953 and resident producer for The Royal Opera, Covent Garden, in 1972. He has produced most of the standard operatic repertoire for many opera houses and festivals in Europe, the United States, and Canada. He is also an accomplished pianist and singer. He has had a long association with Opera Australia, including the Australian premiere of Leoš Janáček's Jenůfa in 1974.

The filmed operas he has been associated with are:
 Semiramide (1990)
 Adriana Lecouvreur (1984)
 Giulio Cesare (1984)
 La bohème (1982)
 Lucrezia Borgia (1980)
 Lucia di Lammermoor (1986)

For over 50 years Copley was the partner of John Hugh Chadwyck-Healey (1922–2014), grandson of Charles Chadwyck-Healey, 1st Baronet. In 2006, they contracted a civil partnership, which Copley described when he was a guest on the BBC Radio 4 Desert Island Discs programme on 3 January 2010.

Copley was appointed Commander of the Order of the British Empire (CBE) in the 2014 New Year Honours for services to opera.

In January 2018, during choir rehearsals for a revival of Copley's 1990 production of Rossini's Semiramide at the Metropolitan Opera in New York City, Copley coached the singers to show reactions to the appearance of Nino's ghost at the end of act 1. He suggested that he would "imagine the character naked" which prompted a complaint from a chorister. The Met's manager Peter Gelb then fired Copley, citing a different account of the complaint. Gelb's action has been described as a "witch hunt" and been widely criticised by other cast members, opera singers and managers. The American Guild of Musical Artists also considered Gelb's response to be inappropriate, and "believed the episode could have been resolved amicably". At the time of Copley's firing, the Met was investigating allegations of sexual misconduct made by four former students against former music director James Levine, details of whose private life were said to have been widely known; in these circumstances the company made sure in reporting on its decision regarding Copley to emphasise its "strong policies in place relating to workplace behaviour (placing) paramount importance on the welfare of its artists and staff".

Footnotes

External links
 Information Britain
 
 "Copley, John Michael Harold", The Riverside Dictionary of Biography
 Interview with John Copley by Bruce Duffie, January 14, 1989

1933 births
Living people
Commanders of the Order of the British Empire
Honorary Members of the Royal Academy of Music
English LGBT people
People educated at King Edward VI Five Ways
English theatre managers and producers
British opera directors
LGBT theatre managers and producers
People from Birmingham, West Midlands